

List of elected representatives

References

75
DeKalb County, Georgia
Fulton County, Georgia